Chilly Beach: The World Is Hot Enough is a Canadian animated comedy film based on the television series Chilly Beach and produced by March Entertainment. The title is a parody of the James Bond film The World Is Not Enough.  An early version of the film had its premiere at Sudbury, Ontario's Cinéfest, and Boston, Massachusetts in 2005. It was released February 5, 2008 on DVD in Canada. A second film, The Canadian President was also later released.

Plot
Dale wonders why no one ever visits Chilly Beach, and realizes that it's due to the cold climate. Thus, Frank invents a super heater to warm Chilly Beach up. When the U.S. learns about it, they steal it and accidentally use it to destroy the planet. Frank and Dale must travel back through time to undo the damage.

In addition to the James Bond-like opening credits and theme song, the movie contains references to Back to the Future and The Terminator.

Voice cast
 Steve Ashton  as Dale McDonald
 Todd Peterson  as Frank Shackleford
 Benedict Campbell  as The Old Man
 Damon D'Oliveira  as Constable Al
 Gianna Simone as FBI Agent Bond girl
 Mike Vitar as Gotham Cop 1
 Chris Ellis as FBI Agent Chris Cooper looks alike
 Don Orsillo as Boston Red Sox 1
 David Ortiz as Boston Red Sox 2
 James Colby as Gotham Cop 2 
 Robert John Burke as FBI Agent Pete
 Kathryn Erbe as FBI Agent Sara
 Kyle Thomas as Joker Thug 1
 Colombe Jacobsen-Derstine as Gotham Pd Detective Annie
 Patrick Renna as Armored Car Truck 1
 Chris Riggi as Jason Bourne Matt Damon looks alike
 Crista Flanagan as Emma Watson looks alike
 Jill Flint as FBI Agent Amy
 Campbell Scott as The President George W. Bush looks alike
 Rob Wiethoff as Bruce Wayne/Batman Christian Bale looks alike
 Sam Waterston as CSI Detective Mike
 Ike Barinholtz as The Terminator Arnold Schwarzenegger looks alike
 Jeffrey Corazzini as Gotham Cop 3
 Anthony Molinari as Gotham Cop 4
 Dean Neistat as Gotham Cop 5
 Derek Graf as FBI HRT SWAT 1
 Landry Allbright as Harley Quinn looks alike
 Leah Lail as Gotham Cop 6
 Shaun Weiss as Gotham Cop 7
 Danny Tamberelli as The Joker looks alike
 Tom Hodges as Gotham Cop 8
 Tom McGowan as FBI Agent Jay
 Ned Luke as Thug 1
 Jeffrey Nordling as FBI Swat 1
 Scott Bryce as FBI Swat 2
 Frank Pando as FBI Swat 3
 Gary Galone as FBI Swat 4
 Amanda Setton as Joker Thug 2
 Corena Chase as FBI Swat 5
 Haviland Morris as Rachel
 Philip Ettinger as Hal Jordan/Green Lantern
 Jay Bulger as FBI Swat 6
 Luke Cook as Gotham Cop 5
 Peter Francis James as Gotham Cop 6
 Susan Blommaert as M
 Tara Karsian as CIA Agent 1
 Valerie Mahaffey as FBI Agent Valerie
 C. Thomas Howell as US Navy Seal 1
 Vincent LaRusso as US Navy Seal 2
 Ashlie Atkinson as Ashley
 Cali Elizabeth Moore as Gotham Cop 7
 Marisa Ryan as Gotham Cop 8
 Amy Morton as Gotham Cop 9
 David Shumbris as Gotham Cop 10
 Will Lyman as US Navy Seal 3
 Chris Noth as US Navy Seal 4
 Alex Mckenna as Blake Lively looks alike
 Bug Hall as Ben Affleck looks like
 Tom Guiry as Brad Pitt looks alike
 Zuzanna Szadkowski as Melissa McCarthy looks alike
 Molly Ringwald as Gotham NewsReporter 1
 Bernadette Peters as New York Broadway Musical Stage 1
 Samantha Espie  as April June
 Mary Lawliss  as Katherine Hilderbrand
 Julie Lemieux  as Becky Sue
 Robert Smith  as Jacques LaRock

External links
 

2008 films
2008 direct-to-video films
2008 animated films
Canadian direct-to-video films
Canadian animated comedy films
Canadian animated feature films
2000s parody films
Animated films about time travel
Films based on television series
2008 comedy films
2000s English-language films
2000s Canadian films